Dilip Kumar Sah is a Nepalese politician who is elected member of Provincial Assembly of Madhesh Province from CPN (Maoist Centre). Sah, a resident of Mirchaiya, Siraha was elected to the 2017 provincial assembly election from Siraha 4(A).

Electoral history

2017 Nepalese provincial elections

References

External links

Living people
Members of the Provincial Assembly of Madhesh Province
Madhesi people
People from Siraha District
Communist Party of Nepal (Maoist Centre) politicians
1982 births